Clifford E. Wilson (December 18, 1946 – December 14, 2018) was an American politician who served in the New York State Assembly from the 37th district from 1977 to 1984.

References

1946 births
2018 deaths
Democratic Party members of the New York State Assembly